Holzner is a surname. Notable people with the surname include:

Claudia Holzner (born 1994), Canadian synchronized swimmer
Felix Holzner (born 1985), German footballer
Hanni Hölzner (1913–1988), German swimmer
Ulrike Holzner (born 1968), German bobsledder